KlæbuPosten (The Klæbu Gazette) is a local Norwegian newspaper published in Klæbu in the municipality of Trondheim in Trøndelag county. The newspaper was launched in February 2007, and it is published on Wednesdays.

Editors
Svein Halvor Moe (2007–2008)
Åke Nord

Circulation
According to the Norwegian Audit Bureau of Circulations and the National Association of Local Newspapers, KlæbuPosten has had the following annual circulation:
2008: 1,170
2009: 1,044
2010: 1,138
2011: 1,150
2012: 1,119
2013: 1,139
2014: 1,105
2015: 1,117
2016: 1,056

References

External links
KlæbuPosten at Kommunenvår.no

Newspapers published in Norway
Norwegian-language newspapers
Mass media in Trøndelag
Klæbu
Publications established in 2007
2007 establishments in Norway